Luis Casimiro Palomo Cárdenas, more known as simply Luis Casimiro, is a Spanish professional basketball coach, who is currently a coach for Coosur Real Betis of the Liga ACB.

Early years
Born in Villamayor de Calatrava, province of Ciudad Real, Casimiro had a very short career as a basketball player.

Coaching career
Casimiro started coaching CB Puertollano, and other Castilian-Manchegan teams, before joining CB Breogán in 1993, as an assistant coach of Ricardo Hevia in the Liga ACB.

In 1993, Casimiro managed Gandía BA, of the Spanish second-tier level, in his first professional experience as a head coach.

Five years later, Casimiro managed TDK Manresa to win the 1997–98 Liga ACB, which is considered to be one of the biggest miracles in the history of Spanish professional club basketball.

After leaving Manresa, Casimiro continued coaching in Spain, in different teams of the Liga ACB and LEB Oro.

In 2002, Casimiro ended up as a runner-up of the Saporta Cup, with Pamesa Valencia. The team was defeated by Montepaschi Siena in the league's final game.

Three years later, he managed Baloncesto Fuenlabrada to achieve a league promotion to the Liga ACB, by winning the 2004–05 LEB. With this title, Casimiro became the first coach to ever win the Liga ACB and the LEB.

On 25 September 2016, Casimiro led Herbalife Gran Canaria to win the 2016 Spanish Supercup title, its first ever national title. In the 2017–18 season, Casimiro reached the ACB semi-finals with Gran Canaria. With this achievement, the team also qualified for the next EuroLeague season, the club's first participation ever. On 13 June 2018, Gran Canaria announced the club and Casimiro separated ways.

On July 8, 2021, he has signed with Promitheas Patras of the Greek Basket League.

On November 22, 2021, he has signed a two-year contract with Coosur Real Betis of the Liga ACB.

Honours
Bàsquet Manresa
 Liga ACB (1): 1997–98
 Lliga Catalana de Bàsquet (2): 1997, 1998

CB Gran Canaria
 Supercopa de España (1): 2016

Valencia BC
 Saporta Cup runner-up: 2001–02''

Baloncesto Fuenlabrada
 LEB (1): 2004–05
 Copa Príncipe de Asturias (1): 2005

Individual
 AEEB Spanish Coach of the Year: 1998

References

External links
 Luis Casimiro at acb.com 
 Luis Casimiro at euroleague.net

Living people
1960 births
Baloncesto Fuenlabrada coaches
Baloncesto Málaga coaches
CB Estudiantes coaches
CB Gran Canaria coaches
Gijón Baloncesto coaches
Liga ACB head coaches
Sportspeople from the Province of Ciudad Real
Spanish basketball coaches
Valencia Basket coaches